Monique de Araújo Alfradique (born April 29, 1986) is a Brazilian actress.

Biography 

Monique was born in Niterói, Rio de Janeiro, Brazil on April 29, 1986. Her desire to become an actress began with children's theater and advertising campaigns.

Career

She began her career on a television show for kids, aired by TV Globo called, Xuxa.  She was on the show from 1999 to 2002.

After appearing in Malhação and Agora É que São Elas, two Brazilian series, she got the leading role in the Brazilian soap opera A Lua Me Disse. In 2004, together with Giselle Policarpo, she starred in the André Prado comedic film Loucuras a Dois.

In 2006, while working on the play "A Mentira" by the Brazilian playwright, Nelson Rodrigues, she was offered the starring role in the television show Malhação, as the villainous Priscilla,. She worked on the show for a year and a half, and then moved on to play Fernanda in another TV Globo soap opera, Beleza Pura.   She later relocated to São Paulo to perform in the Shakespearean play The Comedy of Errors.

In 2009, she participated in the miniseries Cinquentinha, where she played Barbara Romero, granddaughter of the character of Susana Vieira. Also in 2009, she participated in Cama de Gato, where she played the young doctor Erica Castiglione, granddaughter of Berta Loran character.

In 2011, she again played Barbara Romero  in the series Lara com Z, Cinquentinha a second season, and was on display with The School for Wives written by Molière.

Monique took pictures of the Dança no Gelo and Desafio do Faustão in Domingão do Faustão, Rede Globo, where she won the challenge to parade for all the 14 samba schools in São Paulo. In addition, Monique participated in the 2008 video for the song "Alguém que te faz sorrir", the band Fresno.

Currently airing in this soap opera Fina Estampa.

Filmography

Television

Film

Theater

References

External links 

1986 births
Living people
People from Niterói
Brazilian television actresses
Brazilian telenovela actresses
Brazilian film actresses
Brazilian stage actresses